Dutch Public Broadcasting can refer to:

 Dutch public broadcasting system
 Nederlandse Publieke Omroep (organization) (abbr. NPO), Dutch organization administering the above-listed Dutch public broadcasting system